Zoran Plazonić (born 1 February 1989) is a Croatian football midfielder who plays for Iceland third-tier side Reynir Sandgerði. He has also played for Vestri.

References

External links
 
Zoran Plazonić profile at hrsport.net 

1989 births
Living people
Footballers from Split, Croatia
Association football midfielders
Croatian footballers
HNK Hajduk Split players
NK Mosor players
NK Hrvatski Dragovoljac players
NK Primorac 1929 players
NK Široki Brijeg players
Ittihad Tanger players
HNK Šibenik players
NK Imotski players
Vestri (football club) players
Njarðvík FC players
Reynir Sandgerði men's football players
Croatian Football League players
First Football League (Croatia) players
Premier League of Bosnia and Herzegovina players
Botola players
2. deild karla players
1. deild karla players
Croatian expatriate footballers
Expatriate footballers in Bosnia and Herzegovina
Croatian expatriate sportspeople in Bosnia and Herzegovina
Expatriate footballers in Morocco
Expatriate footballers in Iceland
Croatian expatriate sportspeople in Iceland